The 1979 Berlin Open, also known as the International Championships of Berlin, was a men's tennis tournament staged in Berlin, West Germany that was part of the Grand Prix circuit. The tournament was played on outdoor clay courts and was held from 18 June until 24 June 1979. It was the fifth and last edition of the tournament. Sixth-seeded Peter McNamara won the singles title.

Finals

Singles
 Peter McNamara defeated  Patrice Dominguez 6–4, 6–0, 6–7, 6–2
 It was McNamara's first singles title of his career.

Doubles
 Carlos Kirmayr /  Ivan Lendl and  Jorge Andrew /  Stanislav Birner 6–2, 6–1

References

External links
 ITF tournament edition details

Berlin Open
Berlin Open
Berlin Open, 1979
Berlin Open